Mikhail Afanasyev is a Soviet sprint canoeist who competed in the mid-1970s. He won a silver medal in the K-2 1000 m event at the 1974 ICF Canoe Sprint World Championships  in Mexico City.

References

Living people
Year of birth missing (living people)
Soviet male canoeists
ICF Canoe Sprint World Championships medalists in kayak